Stéphane Fortin (born June 21, 1974) is a former Canadian football defensive back who played seven seasons in the Canadian Football League with the Saskatchewan Roughriders, Montreal Alouettes and Calgary Stampeders. He was drafted by the Saskatchewan Roughriders in the second round of the 1999 CFL Draft. Fortin played college football at the University of Indianapolis. He was a member of the Montreal Alouettes team that won the 90th Grey Cup.

References

External links
Just Sports Stats
Alouettes bio 
Fanbase

1974 births
American football defensive backs
Calgary Stampeders players
Canadian football defensive backs
French Quebecers
Indianapolis Greyhounds football players
Living people
Montreal Alouettes players
Players of Canadian football from Quebec
Saskatchewan Roughriders players
Sportspeople from Laval, Quebec